Kane Mitchell (born 1 December 1989) is a former professional Australian rules footballer who played for the Port Adelaide Football Club in the Australian Football League (AFL).

Mitchell had an outstanding 2012 season with Claremont, winning the Sandover Medal for the best and fairest player in the WAFL with a record 58 votes (equalling Matt Priddis' record for Subiaco in 2006), the EB Cook Medal for Claremont's best and fairest player, and playing in Claremont's Premiership winning team, kicking 3 goals.

Mitchell was selected by Port Adelaide with the 5th selection in the 2013 Rookie Draft. He was elevated from the Rookie List due to Nick Salter being placed on the long-term injury list, he made his debut in round 1 against Melbourne at the MCG as a substitute in the fourth quarter. He scored his first AFL goal against GWS in Round 2.

In 2015, he was promoted to Port's senior list. He was delisted by the club in October, but was re-drafted in the 2016 rookie draft.

Mitchell was delisted again at the conclusion of the 2016 season. Following his delisting, Mitchell took a year off to go travelling, returning to play for Claremont in 2018.

References

External links

WAFL playing statistics

Living people
1989 births
Claremont Football Club players
Australian rules footballers from Western Australia
Port Adelaide Football Club players
Port Adelaide Football Club players (all competitions)
Woodville-West Torrens Football Club players
Sandover Medal winners